José Manuel 'Pepe' Mejías López (born 21 January 1959) is a Spanish retired footballer who played as an attacking midfielder.

His career was closely associated to Cádiz, for which he appeared in 304 games both major levels of Spanish football combined, scoring 66 goals.

In La Liga, Mejía also represented Zaragoza, Murcia and Rayo Vallecano, totalling 263 matches and 42 goals in the competition over ten seasons.

Club career
Born in Cádiz, Andalusia, Mejías spent most of his 19-year senior career with Cádiz CF. After starting out with the reserves he was loaned to neighbouring amateurs Jerez Industrial CF, returning in January 1978 and going on to remain with his main club a further eight full seasons; he made his La Liga debut on 9 April 1978, playing the full 90 minutes in a 2–4 home loss against RCD Español.

During his first spell, Mejías constantly alternated between the top division and the Segunda División, promoting three times to the former and being relegated to the latter in 1982 and 1984. In the 1982–83 campaign he scored a career-best 15 goals, helping the Gaditanos return to the top flight.

Mejías left Cádiz in the summer of 1986, joining fellow league side Real Zaragoza. He continued to compete at that level the following years, with Real Murcia (also started 1989–90 with the club in the second tier) and Rayo Vallecano; he appeared with the first in the 1986–87 European Cup Winners' Cup, netting once in seven games – the 2–0 away victory over Vitosha Sofia– to help the Aragonese team reach the semi-finals.

After two more seasons with Cádiz in division two, 33-year-old Mejías retired from professional football and moved to the lower leagues, retiring three years later.

Personal life
Mejías' younger brother, Salvador, was also a footballer. They coincided in several teams during their careers.

References

External links

Stats at Cadistas1910 

1959 births
Living people
Spanish footballers
Footballers from Cádiz
Association football midfielders
La Liga players
Segunda División players
Segunda División B players
Tercera División players
Cádiz CF B players
Cádiz CF players
Jerez Industrial CF players
Real Zaragoza players
Real Murcia players
Rayo Vallecano players
Elche CF players
CD San Fernando players
Spain under-21 international footballers